The money market is a component of the economy.

Money market may also refer to:

 Money market account, a type of bank deposit account
 Money market fund, a type of mutual fund
 Qianshi Hutong in Beijing, also known as the Money Market

See also
 Money Marketing, a UK financial magazine